17P or 17.P or 17-P may refer to:

 17P/Holmes, a comet
 SpaceShipOne flight 17P, a commercial spaceflight
 17α-Hydroxyprogesterone, a steroid hormone and intermediate
 17p, the short arm of the 17th human chromosome that has the p53 tumour suppressor gene
 17-Phenylandrostenol
 17-pounder

See also
 P17 (disambiguation)